SLATEC Common Mathematical Library is a FORTRAN 77 library of over 1400 general purpose mathematical and statistical routines.  The code was developed at US Government research laboratories and is therefore public domain software.

"SLATEC" is an acronym for the Sandia, Los Alamos, Air Force Weapons Laboratory Technical Exchange Committee, an organization formed in 1974  to foster the exchange of technical information between the computer centers of three US government laboratories.

Project history and current status 

In 1977, the SLATEC Common Mathematical Library (CML) Subcommittee decided to construct a library of FORTRAN subprograms to provide portable, non-proprietary, mathematical software that could be used on a variety of computers, including  supercomputers, at the three sites. The computers centers of the Lawrence Livermore National Laboratory, the National Bureau of Standards and the Oak Ridge National Laboratory also participated from 1980–81 onwards.

The main repository for SLATEC is Netlib. The current version is 4.1 (July 1993). Since then, a very small number of minor corrections has been made without incrementing the version number.

The GNU Scientific Library (GSL), initiated in 1996 and stable since 2001, was started with the explicit aim to provide a more modern replacement for SLATEC.

Contents 

Each subroutine in SLATEC is tagged as belonging to one of 13 subpackages. Some of these subpackages are also well known as free-standing FORTRAN subprogram libraries, including BLAS, EISPACK, FFTPACK, LINPACK and QUADPACK. The following table shows all subpackages and the number of subroutines they contain:

References

Further reading
 Walter H. Vandevender, Karen H. Haskell, The SLATEC mathematical subroutine library, ACM SIGNUM Newsletter, Volume 17 Issue 3, September 1982

External links
 SLATEC source code at Netlib
 SLATEC information at GAMS

Fortran libraries
Numerical software
Public-domain software with source code